Weidenbaum is a surname. Notable people with the surname include:

 Marc Weidenbaum (born 1966), American editor
 Murray Weidenbaum (1927–2014), American economist
 Peter Weidenbaum (born 1968), Belgian artist